Sucha Góra may refer to:
 Sucha Góra, Bytom, a district of Bytom, Poland
 Sucha Góra, Podlaskie Voivodeship, a village in Sokółka County, Podlaskie Voivodeship, Poland
 , a mountain in Podkarpackie Voivodeship, Poland
 Sucha Góra TV Tower, on the hill